Strážov Mountains Protected Landscape Area is one of the 14 protected landscape areas in Slovakia. The Landscape Area is situated in the Strážov Mountains and the Súľov Mountains, part of the Western Carpathians, in western Slovakia. It is situated in the Bytča, Ilava, Považská Bystrica, Prievidza, Púchov, and Žilina districts.

The area protects , of which 78% are covered with forests, 19% with farmland and 3% with built-up and water areas.

History
The Protected Landscape Area was established on 27 January 1989. Protected areas declared before include the national nature reserves of Súľov Rocks (declared in 1973) and Strážov (1981) and the nature reserve of Kostolecká tiesňava Ravine (1970).

Geography

References

External links
Strážov Mountains PLA at Slovakia.travel

Protected areas of Slovakia
Protected areas established in 1989
Protected areas of the Western Carpathians
Tourist attractions in Žilina Region
Geography of Žilina Region
Tourist attractions in Trenčín Region
Geography of Trenčín Region